Turicum may refer to:

 Turicum (automobile), a Swiss automobile manufacturer
 Turicum (Zürich), a Roman vicus, now better known as the Swiss city of Zurich
 Turicum (ship, 1992), a passenger ship operating on Lake Zurich in Switzerland